Pumfrey is a surname. Notable people with the surname include:

Bernard Pumfrey (1873–1930), English professional footballer
Nicholas Pumfrey, (1951–2007), styled The Rt Hon. Lord Justice Pumfrey, British barrister

See also
Pumphrey (disambiguation)
Pomphrey
Comfrey